The Chief Secretary of Tobago is the leader of the Tobagonian Government. The Chief Secretary chairs the Tobagonian Cabinet and is primarily responsible for the formulation, development and presentation of Tobagonian Government policy. Additional functions of the Chief Secretary include promoting and representing Tobago in an official capacity, at home and abroad, and responsibility for constitutional affairs, as they relate to devolution and the Tobagonian Government.

The Chief Secretary is a Member of the Assembly, and is nominated by the Tobago House of Assembly before bring officially appointed by the President. Members of the Tobagonian Cabinet as well as councilors of the Tobagonian Government are appointed by the Chief Secretary. As head of the Tobagonian Government, the Chief Secretary is directly accountable to the Tobago House of Assembly for their actions and the actions of the Tobagonian Government.

The official office of the Chief Secretary is in Calder Hall Road, Scarborough, Tobago as well as the Tobago House of Assembly on Jermingham Street.

The current Chief Secretary of the Tobago House of Assembly is Mr. Farley Chavez Augustine of the Progressive Democratic Patriots, he assumed the chair on December 9, 2021.

Election and term 
The Chief Secretary is almost always the leader of the largest party, or the leader of the senior partner in any majority coalition. There is no term of office for a Chief Secretary. In practice, they hold office as long as they retain the confidence of the chamber; indeed, they are required to either resign or seek a parliamentary dissolution (and with it, new elections) if his or her government "no longer enjoys the confidence of the Parliament." Whenever the office of Chief Secretary falls vacant, the President is responsible for appointing the new incumbent; the appointment is formalised at a meeting between the President and the Chief Secretary designate.

If an incumbent Chief Secretary is defeated in a general election, they do not immediately vacate office. The Chief Secretary only leaves office when the Tobago House of Assembly  nominates a successor individual.

The period in office of a Chief Secretary is not linked to the term of members of the Tobago House of Assembly. A maximum four-year term is set for each session of Parliament.

Parliament can be dissolved and an extraordinary general election held, before the expiration of the four-year term.

The Chief Secretary, once appointed continues in office as the head of the devolved Tobago House of Assembly until either resignation, dismissal, or death. Resignation can be triggered off by the passage of a Motion of No Confidence in the Chief Secretary or the Tobagonian Government or by rejecting a Motion of Confidence in the Tobago House of Assembly. In those situations, the Chief Secretary must tender their resignation and the resignation of their government to the president. In such circumstances, the Presiding Officer appoints an interim Chief Secretary, until the Tobago House of Assembly determines on a new nominee to be presented to the President for formal appointment.

Nomination and appointment 
Candidates for the position of Chief Secretary are nominated by the members of the Tobago House of Assembly from among its assembly members at the beginning of each term. The members elect the nominee for the Chief Secretary by majority vote. If no one is elected by a majority of votes cast with the first set of nominations, the process continues until a majority decide to cast their vote for one candidate. This process does not require an absolute majority of the Assembly (currently 7 out of 12 members).

Once this process has occurred the Presiding Officer shall formally send a letter to the incumbent President who must then appoint that nominee to the position of Chief Secretary.

List of Chief Secretaries of Tobago 

Below is a list of office-holders:

Timeline of Chief Secretaries

Previous nominating elections

See also
Tobago House of Assembly
List of Presiding Officers of the Tobago House of Assembly

References

Politics of Trinidad and Tobago
List
Lists of political office-holders in Trinidad and Tobago